Cruize Garlett (born 6 March 1989) is an Australian rules footballer who played for North Melbourne in the Australian Football League (AFL)  between 2009 and 2012.

Playing career

Early career
Garlett played his early football for Railways in Northam before moving to Perth in the West Australian Football League. With Perth Garlett played six matches in 2007.

AFL career
As a result of his form for Perth Garlett was selected as a rookie by North Melbourne in the 2008 Rookie Draft.

He was delisted in October 2012.

Personal
He is the second cousin of Jeff Garlett of the Melbourne Football Club.

References

External links

1989 births
Australian rules footballers from Western Australia
Indigenous Australian players of Australian rules football
North Melbourne Football Club players
People from Northam, Western Australia
North Ballarat Football Club players
Living people
Perth Football Club players
Peel Thunder Football Club players